My Two Brooks is an album by the American rock band The Inevitable Backlash that was released in 2009.

Track listing

References

2009 albums